Aabshaar-E-Ghazal is a ghazal album by legendary Indian singers Asha Bhosle and Hariharan. It was released in the year 1985. The album featured 8 songs, all of them are composed by Hariharan and sung by Asha Bhosle (including 2 duet songs with Hariharan). After many years, Aabshaar-e-Ghazal was re-released as Kuch Door Hamare Saath, in which all tracks were sung by Hariharan alone.

Track listing
All music composed by Hariharan.  Lyrics as noted.

Reception
Aabshar-e-Ghazal got an overwhelming response and was a cult favorite by fans of both singers. It is perhaps Hariharan's most successful effort. It was awarded the prestigious Diva Award for The Best Album of the Year in 1994.

References

Hariharan (singer) albums
1985 albums
CBS Records albums